James Winkfield (April 12, c. 1880–1882 – March 23, 1974) was a Thoroughbred jockey and horse trainer from Kentucky, best remembered as the last African American to ride a winner in the Kentucky Derby (1902).

Winkfield was born in Chilesburg, Kentucky and began his career as a jockey in 1898 at age sixteen. He was suspended for one year after one race for his involvement in a four-horse accident at the starting gate. However, he returned in 1900 to ride alThrive in the Kentucky Derby, finishing third. He rode in the race again in 1901 and 1902, winning on His Eminence and Alan-a-Dale respectively. In 1901, he won 220 races. He competed in his final Derby in 1903, finishing second on Early.

Winkfield was blackballed in the USA after dishonoring a contract to ride for a different owner after agreeing to ride for another one but was offered a chance to race in Russia, where he quickly rose to fame. He won the Russian Oaks five times, the Russian Derby four times, the Czar's Prize on three occasions, and the Warsaw Derby twice. The Russian Revolution caused him to leave the country in 1917, and he moved to France where he resumed racing, scoring numerous wins including the Prix du Président de la République, Grand Prix de Deauville, and Prix Eugène Adam. He retired as a jockey at age fifty having won more than 2,500 races, then began a second successful career as a horse trainer.

Winkfield lived on a farm near the Hippodrome de Maisons-Laffitte (racetrack) in Maisons-Laffitte on the outskirts of Paris. He remained there until fleeing the German occupation of France during World War II. After the war, he eventually returned to the farm at Maisons-Laffitte where he lived until his death in 1974.

While he was treated with respect in Europe, segregation still ruled American society. When Sports Illustrated invited Winkfield to a reception at the Brown Hotel in Louisville in 1961, he was told he couldn't enter by the front door. He was admitted after the magazine explained that he was an invited guest. Winkfield made an appearance at the Kentucky Derby that year to celebrate 60 years since his historic victories. In 2004, he was inducted posthumously into the National Museum of Racing and Hall of Fame. The Jimmy Winkfield Stakes at Aqueduct Racetrack is run in his honor.

In 2005, the United States House of Representatives passed a resolution honoring Winkfield. The full details can be read at the National Museum of Racing and Hall of Fame.

References
 Hotaling, E. Wink: The Incredible Life and Epic Journey of Jimmy Winkfield, (2004) McGraw-Hill Education 
 Drape, Joe  Black Maestro : The Epic Life of an American Legend (2006) William Morrow 
 Davies, Nelly  Jockey noir et célèbre – Mon père cet inconnu (2009) Rocher (Editions du)

External links
African-Americans in the Kentucky Derby (at the Derby's official web site)
African-Americans in the Thoroughbred Industry (at the Paris-Bourbon County Public Library's web site)
James Winkfield at Britannica Online
nelly-davies.com author of Jockey noir et célèbre – Mon père cet inconnu
1921 passport photo ; James Winkfield

1880s births
1974 deaths
American jockeys
French jockeys
French horse trainers
African-American jockeys
United States Thoroughbred Racing Hall of Fame inductees
People from Lexington, Kentucky
American expatriates in the Russian Empire
American expatriates in France